Barchowsky Fluent Handwriting (BFH) is a modern  teaching script for handwriting based on Latin script, developed in the late 20th century by Nan Jay Barchowsky in Maryland, US, with the aim of allowing learners to make an easier transition from print writing to cursive.

Characteristics
BFH is an italic script, similar to the Getty-Dubay Italic, where the letterforms of the print writing version taught to initial learners are very similar to the semi-connected cursive forms taught to intermediate learners.

BFH is written with a slant of 80 degrees, measured counterclockwise from the baseline.

See also
 Spencerian script, a US teaching script
 Palmer script, a US teaching script
 D'Nealian script, a US teaching script
 Zaner-Bloser script, a US teaching script
 Getty-Dubay Italic script, a US teaching script
 Regional handwriting variation

External links
 BFH Handwriting official site

Penmanship